Five referendums were held in Switzerland during 1950. The first was held on 29 January on extending a federal resolution on promoting housebuilding, and was rejected by voters. The second was held on 4 June on the federal budget, and was also rejected by voters. The third was held on 1 October on a popular initiative "for the protection of ground and labour by prohibiting speculation", and was rejected by voters. The final two were held on 3 December on revising article 72 of the constitution regarding the election of the National Council and a federal resolution on financial order between 1951 and 1954. Both were approved by voters.

Background
The January referendum was an optional referendum, and required only a majority of votes in favour. The other four referendums all required double majorities; a majority of the popular vote and majority of the cantons. The decision of each canton was based on the vote in that canton. Full cantons counted as one vote, whilst half cantons counted as half.

Results

January: Extending the federal resolution on housebuilding

June: Federal budget

October: popular initiative banning speculation

December: Constitutional amendment

December: Financial order

References

1950 referendums
1950 in Switzerland
Referendums in Switzerland
Switzerland